Tadeusz Rydzyk (born 3 May 1945 in Olkusz) is a Roman Catholic priest and Redemptorist, founder and director of the conservative Radio Maryja station, and founder of the University of Social and Media Culture in Toruń.

Life and career
Tadeusz Rydzyk was born out of wedlock to his mother, the widowed Mrs. Rydzyk, and her boyfriend Bronisław Kordaszewski and spent his childhood in Olkusz. He studied at the Higher Spiritual Seminary of Redemptorists in Tuchów, and later at the Catholic Theology Academy in Warsaw. He was ordained a priest in 1971 and taught religion in Toruń, Szczecinek and Kraków. In 1986 Rydzyk left for West Germany where he was involved with a radio station Radio Maria International in Balderschwang (later closed by the Catholic Church authorities for moving away from Catholic doctrine).

Following his return to Poland in 1991, Rydzyk started Radio Maryja, the second worldwide Catholic radio station (the first being Vatican Radio). He established the Catholic newspaper Nasz Dziennik ('Our Daily') and the television station Trwam ('I Persist').

On 8 October 2009, Rydzyk earned a PhD in Theology from the Cardinal Stefan Wyszyński University in Warsaw.

Awards
During XIX International Catholic Film Festival Niepokalanów 2004 for the first time awards Multimedia in service of a Gospel  were given and recipients were Rydzyk and Mel Gibson.

On  September 15, 2007 he was awarded the Mater Verbi Catholic weekly „Niedziela” prize on Jasna Góra. The prize is given to people who contributed to "Niedziela" from Poland and abroad.

On  June 28, 2009, Rydzyk received św. Stanisław Medal in appreciation of works that he has inspired.

On  October 26, 2009 he received medal „Zło dobrem zwyciężaj” for his work for the church and for Poland and for promoting teachings of Jerzy Popiełuszko.

In 2010, Rydzyk received the Blessed Jerzy Ciesielski Award.

In September 2010, he received "Sursum Corda" prize of the weekly "Niedziela."

In December 2013, he received the „Tibi Mater Polonia” Cross.

Controversies
In July 2009 Rydzyk made a racist comment towards a black missionary, Michał, who holds Polish citizenship and speaks fluent Polish. Michał was introduced to the stage by Rydzyk with these words 'Dear, there's a negro. My God, you didn't bathe. Come here brother. He did not bathe at all. Look everyone.' Rydzyk later claimed it was a joke and Michał reportedly found the joke funny. He also praised Radio Maryja after Rydzyk's racist introduction.

In February 2011, Rydzyk was fined 3500 zloty after the local district court in Toruń found that he broke the law by using Radio Maryja to call for donations to TV Trwam, the University of Social and Media Culture and the geothermal drilling conducted by the Lux Veritatis Foundation.

In June 2011, while meeting members of the European Parliament, he called Poland "an uncivilized country" and "a totalitarian regime," and claimed that it was not ruled by Poles. The Polish Ministry of Foreign Affairs protested against these statements and sent a diplomatic note to the Holy See, to which Catholic religious orders, including the Redemptorists, are subject.

In 2006, the US-based Anti-Defamation League accused Rydzyk and his Radio Maryja station of antisemitism. However, Rydzyk also has Jewish backers, including Jonny Daniels, an Orthodox Jew from England who heads the "From the Depths Foundation" in Warsaw that highlights the heroism of Poles who rescued Jews during the war and who is a frequent guest on Rydzyk's media outlets. Daniels said that he "feels like a part of the Radio Maryja family."

Tadeusz Rydzyk commented on the award-winning documentary Tell No One that covers child molestation by Catholic Church clergy in Poland as follows: "Is it fair; is it caring? It's a fight against the Church calculated for its destruction." He said that the drama of the victims was turned into a "pedophilia industry" and that "we already had a club of antisemitism, Nazism, nationalism, fascism and now a club of pedophilia was formed. Hatred stands behind all this."

See also
Redemptorists

References

External links
Tadeusz Rydzyk's Facebook Page

Catholic Church in Poland
Polish Roman Catholic priests
1945 births
20th-century Roman Catholic priests
21st-century Roman Catholic priests
Living people
Redemptorists
Polish conservatives
Polish anti-communists
Roman Catholic activists
People from Olkusz